A triode is an electronic amplifying vacuum tube (or valve in British English) consisting of three electrodes inside an evacuated glass envelope: a heated filament or cathode, a grid, and a plate (anode). Developed from Lee De Forest's 1906 Audion, a partial vacuum tube that added a grid electrode to the thermionic diode (Fleming valve), the triode was the first practical electronic amplifier and the ancestor of other types of vacuum tubes such as the tetrode and pentode. Its invention founded the electronics age, making possible amplified radio technology and long-distance telephony. Triodes were widely used in consumer electronics devices such as radios and televisions until the 1970s, when transistors replaced them. Today, their main remaining use is in high-power RF amplifiers in radio transmitters and industrial RF heating devices. In recent years there has been a resurgence in demand for low power triodes due to renewed interest in tube-type audio systems by audiophiles who prefer the pleasantly (warm) distorted sound of tube-based electronics.

The name "triode" was coined by British physicist William Eccles some time around 1920, derived from the Greek τρίοδος, tríodos, from tri- (three) and hodós (road, way), originally meaning the place where three roads meet.

History

Precursor devices

Before thermionic valves were invented, Philipp Lenard used the principle of grid control while conducting photoelectric experiments in 1902.

The first vacuum tube used in radio was the thermionic diode or Fleming valve, invented by John Ambrose Fleming in 1904 as a detector for radio receivers. It was an evacuated glass bulb  containing two electrodes, a heated filament (cathode) and a plate (anode).

Invention
Triodes came about in 1906 when American engineer Lee De Forest and Austrian physicist Robert von Lieben independently patented tubes that added a third  electrode, a control grid, between the filament and plate to control current. Von Lieben's partially-evacuated three-element tube, patented in March 1906, contained a trace of mercury vapor and was intended to amplify weak telephone signals. Starting in October 1906 De Forest patented a number of three-element tube designs by adding an electrode to the diode, which he called Audions, intended to be used as radio detectors. The one which became the design of the triode, in which the grid was located between the filament and plate, was patented January 29, 1907. Like the von Lieben vacuum tube, De Forest's Audions were incompletely evacuated and contained some gas at low pressure. von Lieben's vacuum tube did not see much development due to his death seven years after its invention, shortly before the outbreak of the First World War.

De Forest's Audion did not see much use until its ability to amplify was recognized around 1912 by several researchers, who used it to build the first successful amplifying radio receivers and electronic oscillators. The many uses for amplification motivated its rapid development. By 1913 improved versions with higher vacuum were developed by Harold Arnold at American Telephone and Telegraph Company, which had purchased the rights to the Audion from De Forest, and Irving Langmuir at General Electric, who named his tube the "Pliotron", These were the first vacuum tube triodes. The name "triode" appeared later, when it became necessary to distinguish it from other kinds of vacuum tubes with more or fewer elements (e.g. diodes, tetrodes, pentodes, etc.). There were lengthy lawsuits between De Forest and von Lieben, and De Forest and the Marconi Company, who represented John Ambrose Fleming, the inventor of the diode.

Wider adoption
The discovery of the triode's amplifying ability in 1912 revolutionized electrical technology, creating the new field of electronics, the technology of active (amplifying) electrical devices. The triode was immediately applied to many areas of communication. Triode "continuous wave" radio transmitters replaced the cumbersome inefficient "damped wave" spark gap transmitters, allowing the transmission of sound by amplitude modulation (AM). Amplifying triode radio receivers, which had the power to drive loudspeakers, replaced weak crystal radios, which had to be listened to with earphones, allowing families to listen together. This resulted in the evolution of radio from a commercial message service to the first mass communication medium, with the beginning of radio broadcasting around 1920. Triodes made transcontinental telephone service possible. Vacuum tube triode repeaters, invented at Bell Telephone after its purchase of the Audion rights, allowed telephone calls to travel beyond the unamplified limit of about 800 miles. The opening by Bell of the first transcontinental telephone line was celebrated 3 years later, on January 25, 1915. Other inventions made possible by the triode were television, public address systems, electric phonographs, and talking motion pictures.

The triode served as the technological base from which later vacuum tubes developed, such as the tetrode (Walter Schottky, 1916) and pentode (Gilles Holst and Bernardus Dominicus Hubertus Tellegen, 1926), which remedied some of the shortcomings of the triode detailed below.

The triode was very widely used in consumer electronics such as radios, televisions, and audio systems until it was replaced in the 1960s by the transistor, invented in 1947, which brought the "vacuum tube era" introduced by the triode to a close.  Today triodes are mostly used in high-power applications for which solid state semiconductor devices are unsuitable, such as radio transmitters and industrial heating equipment. However, more recently the triode and other vacuum tube devices have been experiencing a resurgence and comeback in high fidelity audio and musical equipment.  They also remain in use as vacuum fluorescent displays (VFDs), which come in a variety of implementations but all are essentially triode devices.

Construction 

All triodes have a hot cathode electrode heated by a filament, which releases electrons, and a flat metal plate electrode (anode) to which the electrons are attracted, with a grid consisting of a screen of wires between them to control the current.  These are sealed inside a glass container from which the air has been removed to a high vacuum, about 10−9 atm.  Since the filament eventually burns out, the tube has a limited lifetime and is made as a replaceable unit; the electrodes are attached to terminal pins which plug into a socket.  The operating lifetime of a triode is about 2000 hours for small tubes and 10,000 hours for power tubes.

Low power triodes 
Low power triodes have a concentric construction (see drawing right), with the grid and anode as circular or oval cylinders surrounding the cathode. The cathode is a narrow metal tube down the center.  Inside the cathode is a filament called the "heater" consisting of a narrow strip of high resistance tungsten wire, which heats the cathode red-hot (800 - 1000 °C).  This type is called an "indirectly heated cathode".  The cathode is coated with a mixture of alkaline earth oxides such as calcium and thorium oxide which reduces its work function so it produces more electrons.  The grid is constructed of a helix or screen of thin wires surrounding the cathode.  The anode is a cylinder or rectangular box of sheet metal surrounding the grid.  It is blackened to radiate heat and is often equipped with heat-radiating fins. The electrons travel in a radial direction, from cathode through the grid to the anode. The elements are held in position by mica or ceramic insulators and are supported by stiff wires attached to the base, where the electrodes are brought out to connecting pins. A "getter", a small amount of shiny barium metal evaporated onto the inside of the glass, helps maintain the vacuum by absorbing gas released in the tube over time.

High-power triodes 
High-power triodes generally use a filament which serves as the cathode (a directly heated cathode) because the emission coating on indirectly heated cathodes is destroyed by the higher ion bombardment in power tubes. A thoriated tungsten filament is most often used, in which thorium in the tungsten forms a monolayer on the surface which increases electron emission. These generally run at higher temperatures than indirectly heated cathodes. The envelope of the tube is often made of more durable ceramic rather than glass, and all the materials have higher melting points to withstand higher heat levels produced. Tubes with anode power dissipation over several hundred watts are usually actively cooled; the anode, made of heavy copper, projects through the wall of the tube and is attached to a large external finned metal heat sink which is cooled by forced air or water.

Lighthouse tubes 

A type of low power triode for use at ultrahigh frequencies (UHF), the "lighthouse" tube, has a planar construction to reduce interelectrode capacitance and lead inductance, which gives it the appearance of a "lighthouse".  The disk-shaped cathode, grid and plate form planes up the center of the tube - a little like a sandwich with spaces between the layers.  The cathode at the bottom is attached to the tube's pins, but the grid and plate are brought out to low inductance terminals on the upper level of the tube: the grid to a metal ring halfway up, and the plate to a metal button at the top. These are one example of "disk seal" design. Smaller examples dispense with the octal pin base shown in the illustration and rely on contact rings for all connections, including heater and D.C. cathode.

As well, high-frequency performance is limited by transit time: the time required for electrons to travel from cathode to anode. Transit time effects are complicated, but one simple effect is input conductance, also known as grid loading. At extreme high frequencies, electrons arriving at the grid may become out of phase with those departing towards the anode. This imbalance of charge causes the grid to exhibit a reactance that is much less than its low-frequency "open circuit" characteristic.

Transit time effects are reduced by reduced spacings in the tube. Tubes such as the 416B (a Lighthouse design) and the 7768 (an all-ceramic miniaturised design) are specified for operation to 4 GHz. They feature greatly reduced grid-cathode spacings in the order of 0.1 mm.

These greatly reduced grid spacings also give a much higher amplification factor than conventional axial designs. The 7768 has an amplification factor of 225, compared with 100 for the 6AV6 used in domestic radios and about the maximum possible for an axial design.

Anode-grid capacitance is not especially low in these designs. The 6AV6 anode-grid capacitance is 2 picofarads (pF), the 7768 has a value of 1.7 pF. The close electrode spacing used in microwave tubes increases capacitances, but this increase is offset by their overall reduced dimensions compared to lower-frequency tubes.

Operation 

In the triode, electrons are released into the tube from the metal cathode by heating it, a process called thermionic emission.  The cathode is heated red hot by a separate current flowing through a thin metal filament. In some tubes the filament itself is the cathode, while in most tubes there is a separate filament which heats the cathode but is electrically isolated from it.  The interior of the tube is well evacuated so that electrons can travel between the cathode and the anode without losing energy in collisions with gas molecules. A positive DC voltage, which can be as low as 20V or up to thousands of volts in some transmitting tubes, is present on the anode.  The negative electrons are attracted to the positively charged anode (or "plate"), and flow through the spaces between the grid wires to it, creating a flow of electrons through the tube from cathode to anode.

The magnitude of this current can be controlled by a voltage applied on the grid (relative to the cathode). The grid acts like a gate for the electrons. A more negative voltage on the grid will repel more of the electrons, so fewer get through to the anode, reducing the anode current.  A less negative voltage on the grid will allow more electrons from the cathode to reach the anode, increasing the anode current. Therefore, an input AC signal on the grid of a few volts (or less), even at a very high impedance (since essentially no current flows through the grid) can control a much more powerful anode current, resulting in amplification. When used in its linear region, variation in the grid voltage will cause an approximately proportional variation in the anode current; this ratio is called the transconductance.  If a suitable load resistance is inserted in the anode circuit, although the transconductance is somewhat lowered, the varying anode current will cause a varying voltage across that resistance which can be much larger than the input voltage variations, resulting in voltage gain.

The triode is a normally "on" device; and current flows to the anode with zero voltage on the grid.  The anode current is progressively reduced as the grid is made more negative relative to the cathode. Usually a constant DC voltage ("bias") is applied to the grid along with the varying signal voltage superimposed on it. That bias is required so that the positive peaks of the signal never drive the grid positive with respect to the cathode which would result in grid current and non-linear behaviour. A sufficiently negative voltage on the grid (usually around 3-5 volts in small tubes such as the 6AV6, but as much as –130 volts in early audio power devices such as the '45), will prevent any electrons from getting through to the anode, turning off the anode current. This is called the "cutoff voltage". Since beyond cutoff the anode current ceases to respond to the grid voltage, the voltage on the grid must remain above the cutoff voltage for faithful (linear) amplification as well as not exceeding the cathode voltage.

The triode is somewhat similar in operation to the n-channel JFET; it is normally on, and exhibits progressively lower and lower plate/drain current as the grid/gate is pulled increasingly negative relative to the source/cathode. Cutoff voltage corresponds to the JFET's pinch-off voltage (Vp) or VGS(off); i.e., the voltage point at which output current essentially reaches zero. This similarity is limited, however. The triode's anode current is highly dependent on anode voltage as well as grid voltage, thus limiting the voltage gain. On the other hand the JFET's drain current is virtually unaffected by drain voltage, thus it appears as a constant-current device, similar in action to a tetrode or pentode tube (high dynamic output impedance). Both the JFET and tetrode/pentode valves are thereby capable of much higher voltage gains than the triode which seldom exceeds 100. However the power gain, or the output power obtained from a certain AC input voltage is often of greater interest. When these devices are used as cathode followers (or source followers), they all have a voltage "gain" of just under 1, but with a large current gain.

Applications 

Although S.G. Brown's Type G Telephone Relay (using a magnetic "earphone" mechanism driving a carbon microphone element) was able to give power amplification and had been in use as early as 1914, it was a purely mechanical device with limited frequency range and fidelity. It was suited only to a limited range of audio frequencies - essentially voice frequencies.

The triode was the first non-mechanical device to provide power gain at audio and radio frequencies, and made radio practical. Triodes are used for amplifiers and oscillators. Many types are used only at low to moderate frequency and power levels. Large water-cooled triodes may be used as the final amplifier in radio transmitters, with ratings of thousands of watts. Specialized types of triode ("lighthouse" tubes, with low capacitance between elements) provide useful gain at microwave frequencies.

Vacuum tubes are obsolete in mass-marketed consumer electronics, having been overtaken by less expensive transistor-based solid-state devices. However, more recently, vacuum tubes have been making somewhat of a comeback. Triodes continue to be used in certain high-power RF amplifiers and transmitters. While proponents of vacuum tubes claim their superiority in areas such as high-end and professional audio applications, the solid-state MOSFET has similar performance characteristics.

Characteristics 

In triode datasheets, characteristics linking the anode current (Ia) to anode voltage (Va) and grid voltage (Vg) are usually given. From here, a circuit designer can choose the operating point of the particular triode. Then the output voltage and amplification of the triode can be evaluated graphically by drawing a load line on the graph.

In the example characteristic shown on the image, suppose we wish to operate it at a quiescent anode voltage Va of 200V and a grid voltage bias of −1 volt. This implies a quiescent plate (anode) current of 2.2mA (using the yellow curve on the graph). In a class-A triode amplifier, one might place an anode resistor (connected between the anode and the positive power supply). If we choose  Ra = 10000 ohms, the voltage drop on it would be V+ - Va = Ia × Ra = 22.V for the chosen anode current of Ia = 2.2mA. Thus we require a power supply voltage V+ = 222V in order to obtain Va = 200V on the anode.

Now suppose we impress on the -1V bias voltage a signal of 1V peak-peak, so that the grid voltage varies between -.5V and -1.5V. When Vg=-.5V, the anode current will increase to 3.1mA, lowering the anode voltage to Va =  V+ - 10000Ω × 3.1mA = 191V (orange curve). When Vg=-1.5V, the anode current will decrease to 1.4mA, raising the anode voltage to Va =  V+ - 10000Ω × 1.4mA = 208V (green curve). Therefore a 1V peak-peak signal on the input (grid) causes an output voltage change of about 17V. 

Thus voltage amplification of the signal is obtained. The ratio of these two changes, the voltage amplification factor (or mu) is 17 in this case. It is also possible to use triodes as cathode followers in which there is no voltage amplification but a huge reduction in dynamic impedance; in other words, the current is greatly amplified (as it also is in the common-cathode configuration described above). Amplifying either the voltage or current results in power amplification, the general purpose of an amplifying tube (after all, either the current or voltage alone could be increased just using a transformer, a passive device).

See also 
Hanso Idzerda
List of vacuum tubes

References

External links 

  — A French page on thermionic valves. Of particular interest is the 17-minute video showing the manual production of triodes.
 Triode valve tutorial

Telecommunications-related introductions in 1906
Audiovisual introductions in 1906
Vacuum tubes

de:Elektronenröhre#Triode
it:Valvola termoionica#Triodo
sv:Elektronrör#Trioden